Dmytro Shynkarenko (born 26 January 2000) is a Ukrainian professional footballer who plays as a defender for Prykarpattia Ivano-Frankivsk.

Career
Shynkarenko was born in Donetsk Oblast, Ukraine, and began to play football with the local FC Mariupol youth academy playing in the Ukrainian Premier League Reserves and Under 19 Championship. 

In August 2020 he signed a one-year loan deal with Ukrainian First League side Avanhard Kramatorsk.

In January 2023 he moved to Prykarpattia Ivano-Frankivsk.

References

External links
Statistics at UAF website (Ukr)
 

2000 births
Living people
Sportspeople from Mariupol
Ukrainian footballers
Association football defenders
FC Mariupol players
FC Kramatorsk players
Ukrainian First League players
21st-century Ukrainian people